Princess Stella Oduah Ogiemwonyi (née Oduah; born 5 January 1962), is a Nigerian Senator and former Minister of Aviation. She was confirmed to the ministerial post and sworn in on July 2, 2011 and was deployed to the Ministry of Aviation on July 4, 2011. She was however relieved of her duties as Minister of Aviation on 12 February 2014. She was also active in the political campaign of former President Goodluck Jonathan, where she served as his campaign's Director of Administration and Finance.

In 2013, she was one of the delegates chosen by the President to attend the Papal inauguration of Pope Francis together with David Mark, President of the Senate and Viola Onwuliri, Foreign Minister.

On 23 February 2017, Punch Newspaper reported her four companies accounts frozen over alleged indebtedness of $16,412,819.06 and N100,493,225.59 by the Federal high court in Lagos. The four companies are Sea Petroleum and Gas Company Limited, Sea Shipping Agency Limited, Rotary Engineering Services Limited, and Tour Afrique Company Limited with 21 bank accounts.

She has been involved in numerous controversies ranging from highly inflated purchase of BMW bullet-proof cars without following due process as well as allegations that Stella Oduah-Ogiemwonyi purportedly lied about how she obtained an MBA degree from St Paul's College. However, the News website, SaharaReporters, had on Jan 6th 2014 quoted authorities at St. Paul's College, where Mrs. Oduah claimed she studied for bachelor's and master's degrees, as saying they did not award her an MBA at any time as the university does not even have a graduate school or graduate programme. She said she will use her second term in the office to curb drug abuse and eradicate cancer.

Senate career 
In 2015, she was elected to the Nigerian Senate to represent Anambra North Senatorial District. She was one of the only seven women elected to the 8th. The others were Rose Okoji Oko, Uche Ekwunife, Fatimat Raji Rasaki, Oluremi Tinubu, Abiodun Olujimi and Binta Garba. Oduah was re-elected to a second term in the Senate in 2019.

Background
Oduah was born to Igwe D.O. Oduah of Akili-Ozizor, Ogbaru L.G.A. in Anambra State on January 5, 1962. Oduah-Ogiemwonyi received her bachelor's and master's degree (in Accounting and Business Administration respectively) in the United States. She returned to Nigeria in 1983 and she joined the Nigerian National Petroleum Corporation.

In 1992, she left the NNPC to establish the Sea Petroleum & Gas Company Limited (SPG), an independent marketer of petroleum products in Nigeria.

She was married to the former Minister for Works, Engr. Chris Ogiemwonyi and has children.

Politics 
On February 9, The Economic and Financial Crime Commission (EFCC) indicted Stella Oduah, and the Nigerian Subsidiary of Chinese Construction Giant, CCECC, in allege fraudulent cash transaction of about N5billion over five months in 2014.

On 26 August 2021, Stella Oduah left People's Democratic Party to join the All Progressives Congress.  When asked, She said she joined the ruling party because she wants to change the “political narrative” in the South-East region of the country.

References

1962 births
Women members of the Senate (Nigeria)
Aviation ministers of Nigeria
Living people
Nigerian Roman Catholics
21st-century Nigerian women politicians
21st-century Nigerian politicians
Members of the Senate (Nigeria)
Igbo people
Igbo politicians
Women government ministers of Nigeria
All Progressives Congress politicians